Home Alone: The Holiday Heist (also known as Home Alone 5: The Holiday Heist) is a 2012 American made-for-television comedy film. It is the fifth installment in the Home Alone franchise. It stars Christian Martyn, Jodelle Ferland, Malcolm McDowell, Debi Mazar, and Eddie Steeples. The film premiered on ABC Family (now Freeform) on November 25, 2012, during the network's annual Countdown to 25 Days of Christmas programming block. It is the second film, after Home Alone 3, not to focus on the McCallister family, although there are numerous homages to the previous films. Home Alone 5 received mainly negative reviews, although it fared better than the fourth film.

Plot

The Baxter family move from California to Maine and settle into their new house during the Christmas season. 10-year-old Finn Baxter (Christian Martyn) and his older sister Alexis (Jodelle Ferland) are technophiles who isolate themselves from their parents Curtis (Doug Murray) and Catherine (Ellie Harvie) and the outside world. Finn is often playing video games and Alexis is often on her phone and computer. Encouraged by his dad to socialize, Finn befriends his neighbor Mason (Peter DaCunha) who informs him about the legend of a smothered gangster whose ghost haunts the Baxters' new home, leaving Finn paranoid.

While the family leaves their home to go Christmas shopping, a group of thieves consisting of Sinclair (Malcolm McDowell), Jessica (Debi Mazar), and their new safecracker Hughes (Eddie Steeples) carry out their plan to break in and steal an old, long lost Edvard Munch painting valued at $85 million, unaware the house is occupied. They are unable to locate the painting in the basement safe. As the Baxters return home, the thieves quickly flee. At night, Curtis and Catherine leave for a Christmas party hosted by Catherine's new boss, Mr. Carson (Ed Asner). Finn and Alexis stay behind upon being grounded by their parents for their actions. Finn is not permitted to play video games and Alexis can only use her phone for emergency calls.

That night, the thieves plan to return, thinking the house will be clear. Sinclair confides in Jessica and Hughes that the painting they seek is The Widow, a portrait of his great-grandmother and her family that was stolen decades ago. Meanwhile, Finn adventures in the house and finds a spare controller. Searching for new batteries, he accidentally drops one into the basement. Finn has Alexis accompany him to retrieve it and they find the safe unlocked and a secret room behind it, which houses the painting Sinclair is looking for. Frightened by the portrait, Finn flees and Alexis accidentally triggers a trap and ends up locked in the room.

As an ongoing snowstorm worsens, Curtis and Catherine are forced to stay at the Christmas party, worrying about their kids at home. With Alexis locked behind the safe, Finn goes shopping for supplies at a hardware store to break her out, only being able to afford string. After stumbling across Sinclair, he overhears the trio discuss plans to break into his house. Rushing home, Finn tells his online friend Simon (Bill Turnbull) about the situation. Finn sets up numerous booby traps around the house, including ice on the patio (a trap from the original film), a snow blower blowing marbles in the garage, a carton full of tar, a coal-filled stocking, some nasty-tasting gingerbread cookies, and cotton balls and flour flying out of the sink. The thieves are forced to go through the booby traps, getting injured as they do so, with the glamorous Jessica getting covered in tar. Soon enough, Curtis and Catherine are able to drive home. Using Finn's gamertag and his parents' credit card details, a concerned Simon contacts them to warn about the danger their kids are in, but they suspect him and call the police on him instead.

Back at the house, Sinclair, Jessica, and Hughes capture Finn and detain him in the Suburban. Sinclair and Hughes go to open the safe. Mason, however, saves Finn by throwing snowballs at the leather-clad Jessica, who is now very disheveled. She is eventually knocked out by the snowballs.

Meanwhile, Sinclair and Hughes gain entry to the safe, finding the painting and Alexis, who threatens to destroy it. Finn flees and frees Alexis while triggering the trap that locks the duo in the basement, which is seen on Simon's television by the police officers who detained him. With Jessica encased inside a snowman by Mason, the police arrive to arrest the intruders. The family receives four museum passes and $30,000 as a reward for capturing the fugitives and recovering the painting. As an apology, Finn's parents send Simon a plane ticket to return home and spend Christmas with his family.

On Christmas Day, Finn receives a snowboard and an expansion pack to "Robo Infantry 3". Alexis gets a tablet computer, and Finn and his dad get a camping guide. Finn decides to take a break from video games and go snowboarding with Mason, now his best friend. The final scene shows the offenders having their mug shots taken at the police station as a female police officer splices a copy of the mug shots into a portrait.

Cast

 Christian Martyn as Finn Baxter
 Jodelle Ferland as Alexis Baxter
 Malcolm McDowell as Sinclair
 Debi Mazar as Jessica
 Eddie Steeples as Hughes
 Ellie Harvie as Catherine Baxter
 Doug Murray as Curtis Baxter
 Ed Asner as Mr. Carson
 Peter DaCunha as Mason
 Adriana O'Neil as Gabby Maranta
 Bill Turnbull as Simon Hassler
 Chris Sigurdson as Clerk
 Evan Scott as Santa Claus in sleigh

Production

Originally titled Home Alone: Alone in the Dark, development for the film began in March 2012 as a co-production between ABC Family and Fox TV Studios. Both companies also co-produced Home Alone 4 in 2002.

The film was filmed in Winnipeg, Manitoba, Canada.

Reception

Box office 
The film grossed $996,000 in home video sales.

Critical response
Home Alone 5 received mainly negative reviews, although it fared better than the previous installment in the series. Emily Ashby of Common Sense Media awarded the film 2 out of 5 stars, writing that although the film was a "predictable slapstick comedy", it "still delivers the laughs".

Home media
The television film was released on DVD on October 29, 2013, in the United States and Canada. It was released in Region 4 on November 12, 2014. In Region 2, the film was released in 2013 but was initially only available on downloads and online streaming and its distribution there remains mainly focused on those formats. On November 2, 2015, the film was released on DVD in the United Kingdom as part of a box set of the first five Home Alone films exclusively on Amazon.co.uk.

In November 2020, Disney began to feature the original Home Alone trilogy on their streaming platform service Disney+ in celebration of the first film's 30th anniversary. The fourth and fifth installments were released on HBO Max and were added to Disney+ on December 17, 2021.

See also
 List of Christmas films

References

External links

 

ABC Family original films
2010s English-language films
Home Alone (franchise)
Films directed by Peter Hewitt
Films scored by David Kitay
Films set in Maine
American children's comedy films
2010s children's comedy films
Christmas television films
Films about missing people
Television sequel films
American Christmas comedy films
American comedy television films
2010s Christmas comedy films
Films shot in Winnipeg
20th Century Fox Television films
2012 films
2010s American films